Observe is an international collective of street photographers. Established in June 2013, it brings together photographers who share the same principles, views and interests to produce projects, exhibitions, publications and events. Although mainly focusing on street photography, it is not limited to one specific genre and its members explore various genres and methods of photographic practice.

Manifesto 
Observe’s mission statement on its website reads as follows:

“OBSERVE is an international photography collective focused primarily on the practice of candid street photography. Spanning four continents we are united by a common fascination with watching and documenting the diverse humanity that surrounds us. While acknowledging that photography is at its core an individual pursuit, our membership finds benefit in mutual curation and support, discussion, and other collaborative interactions.”

Members

Current members 

Greg Allikas
David Horton
Marcelo Argolo
Danielle Houghton
 Fadi BouKaram 
 Michael May
 Ronen Berka
 Guille Ibañez
 Larry Cohen 
 Ilya Shtutsa
 Chris Farling
 Kristin Van den Eede
 Larry Hallegua
 Tom Young

Past members 

 Antonis Damolis
 Simone Fisher
 Christos Kapatos
 Oguz Ozkan
 Tavepong Pratoomwong
 Jason Reed

Exhibitions and festivals 
In 2014, Observe was a Featured Collective at the Miami Street Photography Festival, and Chris Farling and Danielle Houghton were part of the jury for its competition.

From 12 June to 26 July 2015, Observe held its first group exhibition at the Staedtische Galerie in Iserlohn, Germany. The exhibition was linked to an international contest, themed Under Construction.

Two years later, the same gallery organised its first international street photography festival in collaboration with Observe, Observations 2017. The festival took place from 14–23 July and included various exhibitions at seven separate locations in Iserlohn. One of the exhibitions included the finalists of the 2017 Down by the River Competition, while another included the work of Observe members.

In August 2017, Observe's Jason Reed, Nick Turpin from In-Public, and Hoxton Mini Press organised Street London, a street photography symposium in London. The festival included talks by Siegfried Hansen, David Gibson and Dougie Wallace.

In September 2019, Observe was a featured collective at the Aussie Street Photography Festival in Sydney, Australia. In addition to a dedicated exhibition, four members of Observe (Danielle Houghton, Guille Ibanez, Kirstin van den Eede and Tom Young) acted as judges for the open call competition.

Publications 
Observe has published four magazines with work by its members:
 Observations Vol.1 n°1 (2016): Personal Reflections on Photography
 Observations Vol.1 n°2 (2016): Personal Reflections on Fear
 Observations Vol.2 n°1 (2017): Personal Reflections on Home
 Observations Vol.3 n°1 (2018): Personal Reflections on Faith
 Observations Vol.4 n°1 (2019): Personal Reflections on Nostalgia

In 2017, the work of Ronen Berka, Ilya Shtutsa, Danielle Houghton, and former member Tavepong Pratoomwong was included in 100 Great Street Photographs, edited by David Gibson.

References

External links 

Street photographers
Photography organizations